The 2011–12 Icelandic Hockey League season was the 21st season of the Icelandic Hockey League, the top level of ice hockey in Iceland. Five teams participated in the league, and Ísknattleiksfélagið Björninn won the championship.

Regular season

Final 
 Skautafélag Reykjavíkur - Ísknattleiksfélagið Björninn 2:3

External links 
 Icelandic Ice Hockey Federation

Ice
Icelandic Hockey League seasons
2011–12 in Icelandic ice hockey